Dr. Mohammad Shahidehpour is a Carl Bodine Distinguished Professor and Chairman in the Electrical and Computer Engineering Department at Illinois Institute of Technology.  He is the author of more than 300 technical papers and five books on electric power systems planning, operation, and control.

Career
Shahidehpour was the president of National Electrical Engineering Honor Society (Eta Kappa Nu) and served on its executive board for eight years. He was Editor of the IEEE Transactions on Power Systems for fifteen years, and is currently the Vice President of Publication for IEEE/PES and also Editor in Chief of the IEEE Transactions on Smart Grid. He is a member of the editorial board of KIEE Journal of Power Engineering (Korea), International Journal of Emerging Electric Power Systems, IEEE Power and Energy Magazine, and International Journal of Electric Power Systems Research.  Shahidehpour is an IEEE Distinguished Lecturer and has lectured across the globe on electricity restructuring issues.  He is also an Honorary Professor at North China Electric Power University in China and Sharif University of Technology in Iran.  He is a Fellow of IEEE. He was also elected a member of the National Academy of Engineering in 2016 for contributions to the optimal scheduling of generation in a deregulated electricity market with variable renewable energy sources.

Awards
Shahidehpour is the recipient of:

2007 IEEE/PES T. Burke Hayes Faculty Recognition Award in Electric Power Engineering
2005 IEEE/PES Best Transactions Paper Award
2004 IEEE/PSO Best Transactions Paper Award
Edison Electric Institute's Outstanding Faculty Award
ΗΚΝ’s Outstanding Young Electrical Engineering Award
Sigma Xi’s Outstanding Researcher Award
IIT's Outstanding Faculty Award
University of Michigan’s Outstanding Teaching Award

Education 
 Ph.D. Electrical Engineering Department, University of Missouri, Columbia, 1981
 M.S. Electrical Engineering Department, University of Missouri, Columbia, 1978
 B.S. Electrical Engineering Department, Sharif University of Technology, Iran, 1977

See also
Sukumar Brahma
Johan H. Enslin

References 
 M.Shahidepour's website at Sharif University of Technology
 M.Shahidepour's website at Illinois Institute of Technology
 M.Shahidepour's resume

Iranian electrical engineers
American electrical engineers
Iranian emigrants to the United States
Sharif University of Technology alumni
Electrical engineering academics
Fellow Members of the IEEE
Living people
Illinois Institute of Technology faculty
Members of the United States National Academy of Engineering
1955 births